Kahlil Lorenzo Watson (born April 16, 2003) is an American professional baseball shortstop in the Miami Marlins organization. He was selected in the first round of the 2021 Major League Baseball draft by the Marlins.

Amateur career
Watson attended Wake Forest High School in Wake Forest, North Carolina. He played both baseball and football. As a freshman, Watson hit .389 with two home runs, 22 runs batted in (RBIs) and 17 stolen bases. As a sophomore he hit .578 with six home runs, 23 RBI and 26 stolen bases. In 2021, as a senior, he hit .513 with six home runs. He committed to North Carolina State University to play college baseball.

Professional career
Watson was selected 16th overall by the Miami Marlins in the 2021 Major League Baseball draft. 
He signed for $4.5 million. He made his professional debut with the Rookie-level Florida Complex League Marlins, slashing .394/.524/.606 with three doubles, two triples, five RBIs and four stolen bases over nine games. He opened the 2022 season with the Jupiter Hammerheads of the Single-A Florida State League. During a game on July 1, Watson struck out on a check swing and subsequently pointed his bat at the first base umpire as if it were a gun and made a shooting gesture. He was suspended from the team although he was not placed on the temporally inactive list. On July 22, he was demoted to the Rookie-level Florida Complex League Marlins where he played his first game since July 1.

References

External links

2003 births
Living people
African-American baseball players
Baseball players from North Carolina
Baseball shortstops
21st-century African-American sportspeople
Florida Complex League Marlins players
Jupiter Hammerheads players